The 2015 Malvern Hills District Council election took place on 7 May 2015 to elect members of Malvern Hills District Council in England. This was on the same day as the general election for the House of Commons of the United Kingdom and other local elections.

The Conservative Party maintained their control of the council.

Ward results

References

2015 English local elections
May 2015 events in the United Kingdom
2015
2010s in Worcestershire